The Dixie Rotary Bowl was a college bowl game initiated by the St. George, Utah Rotary Club and hosted at Greater Zion Stadium, the home field of Dixie State Junior College in St. George, Utah. From 1986 to 2005, the game was a junior college bowl sanctioned by the National Junior College Athletic Association, featuring top NJCAA teams. The bowl was a NCAA Division II game from 2006 through 2008 after Dixie State University became a four-year college and transitioned to Division II. The game was canceled before the beginning of the 2009 season, after the home team had failed to appear in consecutive seasons, reducing local interest.

History

Shortly after its creation, the bowl became recognized as one of the top junior college bowl games in the nation. Beginning in 1991, the game was broadcast on the Armed Forces Radio Network. The 1996 game was televised live to 33 states by Prime Sports Network, the first live broadcast of a junior college bowl game. Dixie State played in 19 of the 20 junior college games (all but the 1992 bowl), posting a 15-4 record. In 1999 and again in 2003, the Dixie Rotary Bowl played host to the NJCAA national championship; ironically, these were two of the four times that Dixie State JC lost the game.

The Dixie Rotary Bowl became a NCAA Division II game in 2006. The NCAA gave Dixie State University special permission to participate in the bowl while serving as a provisional Division II member during the 2006 and 2007 seasons. In 2006 Dixie State received an automatic bid, facing the highest-ranked team in the Rocky Mountain Athletic Conference (RMAC) not invited to the NCAA Division II football playoffs. In 2007 the bowl signed a participation agreement with the RMAC and the Great Northwest Athletic Conference (GNAC), providing for each conference to send its highest-ranked team that did not receive a bid to the Division II playoffs. The final two Dixie Rotary Bowls were played under those terms.

NJCAA National Championships 

The Dixie Rotary Bowl twice played host to the NJCAA National Football Championship. The first contest was an unsanctioned de facto championship between #1 Dixie State College and #3 Butler Community College in 1999. Butler pulled off an upset, defeating Dixie State 49-35. 

In 2003, the Dixie Rotary Bowl organizing committee received official sanction for the game to be the NJCAA National Football Championship. #1 Butler and #2 Dixie State again met for the title, with Butler winning 14-10.

Game results

NJCAA bowls

NCAA Division II bowls

References

Defunct college football bowls
Utah Tech Trailblazers football
NCAA Division II football
Recurring sporting events established in 1986
Recurring sporting events disestablished in 2009